The football (soccer) Campeonato Brasileiro Série B 2004, the second level of Brazilian National League, was played from April 23 to December 11, 2004. The competition had 24 clubs and two of them were promoted to Série A and six were relegated to Série C.

In the first round, each team played against each other, much like what happens in Série A. However, in contrast to Série A, each team played against the other only once. Therefore, each team played 23 games, 12 home and 11 away (or the opposite). The eight best ranked teams advanced to the second round, where they were divided in two groups of four. Teams in each group played against each other home and away. The two best ranked teams in each group advanced to the final round. Those four teams were put in a single group, and played against each other home and away.

Brasiliense finished the final phase group with most points and was declared 2004 Brazilian Série B champions, claiming the promotion to the 2005 Série A along with Fortaleza, the runners-up. The six worst ranked teams in the first round (América-RN, Remo, América Mineiro, Joinville, Mogi Mirim and Londrina) were relegated to play Série C in 2005.

Teams

 América Mineiro (MG)
 América-RN (RN)
 Anapolina (GO)
 Avaí (SC)
 Bahia (BA)
 Brasiliense (DF)
 Caxias (RS)
 Ceará (CE)
 CRB (AL)
 Fortaleza (CE)
 Joinville (SC)
 Ituano (SP)
 Londrina (PR)
 Marília (SP)
 Mogi Mirim (SP)
 Náutico (PE)
 Paulista (SP)
 Portuguesa (SP)
 Remo (PA)
 Santa Cruz (PE)
 Santo André (SP)
 São Raimundo (AM)
 Sport (PE)
 Vila Nova (GO)

First stage

Matches

Second stage

Group A

Group B

Final stage

Trivia
 Santo André was punished by losing 12 points for fielding 2 ineligible players (Osmar and Dirceu) in games 1 and 2 of the first round. That eliminated Santo André from a second round spot and allowed Santa Cruz to move ahead and clinch the final spot for the second round.
 Fortaleza had to beat Avaí by two goals in the last game of the season in order to be promoted to the Brazilian elite. So on December 11, 2004 they were able to beat Avaí 2-0 in front of their home crowd and clinch the spot.

Sources
 https://web.archive.org/web/20090102203607/http://www.rsssf.com/tablesb/braz2-04.html

2004 in Brazilian football leagues
Campeonato Brasileiro Série B seasons